The Windermere Children is a 2020 biographical drama film written by Simon Block and directed by Michael Samuels. Based on the experience of child survivors of the Holocaust, it follows the children and staff of a camp set up on the Calgarth Estate  in Troutbeck Bridge, near Lake Windermere, England, where the survivors were helped to rehabilitate, rebuild their lives, and integrate into the British society. The film was produced by Simon Block as 'executive producer' with Nancy Bornat as factual producer and Ben Evans as development producer. The film first aired on BBC Two in January 2020.

Cast
 Iain Glen as Jock Lawrence 
 Romola Garai as Marie Paneth
 Thomas Kretschmann as Oscar Friedmann
 Tim McInnerny as Leonard Montefiore 
 Philipp Christopher as Georg Lauer
 Kuba Sprenger as Ike Alterman 
 Anna Schumacher as Edith Lauer 
 Pascal Fischer as Ben Helfgott
 Jakub Jankiewicz as Salek Falinower
 Kacper Swietek as Chaim Olmer
 Tomasz Studzinski as Arek Hersh
 Lukasz Zieba as Juliusz

Production
The real Calgarth Estate was demolished in the 1960s. The Lakes School near Windermere now stands on the former site of the wartime housing scheme that actually housed the children in 1945.

Although set in the Lake District, the production was actually filmed in locations around Northern Ireland.

Reception

Awards
In October 2020, The Windermere Children won the Best European TV Movie of the Year prize at Prix Europa. A jury member commented "This story gives hope, told with a twinkle in the eye, making the children's stories, their traumas and their losses manageable for the viewer."

References

External links
 
 
 The Windermere children: In their own words - BBC Bitesize
 Lake District Holocaust Project
 The Boys - World Jewish Relief

2020 television films
2020 films
2020 biographical drama films
BBC television dramas
British historical drama films
Films about Jews and Judaism
Films set in the 1940s
Holocaust films
World War II films based on actual events
2020s historical drama films
British biographical drama films
2020s British films
British drama television films